The stone-carved Zimbabwe Bird is the national emblem of Zimbabwe, appearing on the national flags and coats of arms of both Zimbabwe and Rhodesia, as well as on banknotes and coins (first on the Rhodesian pound and then on the Rhodesian dollar). It probably represents the bateleur eagle (Terathopius ecaudatus) or the African fish eagle (Haliaeetus vocifer). The bird's design is derived from a number of soapstone sculptures found in the ruins of the medieval city of Great Zimbabwe.

It is now the definitive icon of independent Zimbabwe, with Matenga (2001) listing over 100 organisations which now incorporate the Bird in their logo.

Origins
The original carved birds are from the ruined city of Great Zimbabwe, which was built by ancestors of the Shona, starting in the 11th century and inhabited for over 300 years. They are unique to Great Zimbabwe; nothing like them has been discovered elsewhere.

Various explanations have been advanced to explain the symbolic meaning of the birds. One suggestion is that each bird was erected in turn to represent a new king, but this would have required improbably long reigns. More probably, the Zimbabwe birds represent sacred or totemic animals of the Shona – the bateleur eagle (Shona: chapungu), which was held to be a messenger from Mwari (God) and the ancestors, or the fish eagle (hungwe) which it has been suggested was the original totem of the Shona.

Colonial acquisition and return to Zimbabwe

In 1889 a European hunter, Willi Posselt, travelled to Great Zimbabwe after hearing about it from another European explorer, Karl Mauch. He climbed to the highest point of the ruins despite being told that it was a sacred site where he should not trespass, and found the birds positioned in the centre of an enclosure around an apparent altar. He later wrote:

Posselt compensated Andizibi with a payment of blankets and "some other articles". As the bird on its pedestal was too heavy for him to carry, he hacked it off and hid the pedestal with the intention of returning later to retrieve it. He subsequently sold his bird to Cecil Rhodes, who mounted it in the library of his Cape Town house, Groote Schuur, and decorated the house's stairway with wooden replicas. Rhodes also had stone replicas made, three times the size of the original, to decorate the gates of his house in England near Cambridge. A German missionary came to own the pedestal of one bird, which he sold to the Ethnological Museum in Berlin in 1907. 

Rhodes' acquisition of Posselt's bird prompted him to commission an investigation of the Great Zimbabwe ruins by James Theodore Bent, which took place in 1891 following the British South Africa Company's invasion of Mashonaland. Bent recorded that there were eight birds, six large and two small, and that there had probably originally been more as there were several additional stone pedestals of which the tops had been broken off.

The colonists erroneously attributed Great Zimbabwe to ancient Mediterranean builders, believing native Africans to be incapable of constructing such a complex structure; thus in Rhodes' mind, as a 1932 guidebook put it, it was "a favourite symbol of the link between the order civilisation derived from the North or the East and the savage barbarism of Southern and Central Africa before the advent of the European." Bent attributed the birds, wholly erroneously, to the Phoenicians.

In 1981, a year after the attainment of independence in Zimbabwe, the South African government returned four of the sculptures to the country in exchange for a world-renowned collection of Hymenoptera (bees, wasps and ants) housed in Harare; the fifth remains at Groote Schuur. In 2003, the German museum returned its portion of the bird's pedestal to Zimbabwe. The birds were displayed for a while in the Natural History Museum in Bulawayo and the Museum of Human Sciences in Harare, but are now housed in a small museum on the Great Zimbabwe site.

Cultural depictions
The Zimbabwe bird has been a symbol of Zimbabwe and its predecessor states since 1924. The crest of Southern Rhodesia's coat of arms incorporated the Zimbabwe bird, and over time the bird became a widespread symbol of the colony. The paper money and coins of the Federation of Rhodesia and Nyasaland, issued by the Bank of Rhodesia and Nyasaland also displayed the bird, as did the Flag of Rhodesia. The flag and state symbols of modern Zimbabwe continue to feature the Zimbabwe Bird.
It is now the definitive icon of independent Zimbabwe with Matenga (2001) listing over 100 state, corporate and sporting organisations which incorporate the Bird in their emblems and logos.

References and sources

External links

Birds in art
National symbols of Rhodesia
National symbols of Zimbabwe
Stone sculptures
Zimbabwean culture
African art
Heraldic birds
Heraldic eagles